Nattiqtuut formerly the Entry Islands are an island group located in Coronation Gulf, south of Victoria Island, west of Kiillinnguyaq, in the Kitikmeot Region, Nunavut, Canada. Other island groups in the vicinity include the Porden Islands, Triple Islands, and Ungiiviit.

References 

Islands of Coronation Gulf
Uninhabited islands of Kitikmeot Region